Scripted reality (sometimes also euphemized as structured reality or constructed reality) in television and entertainment is a subgenre of reality television with some or all of the contents being scripted or pre-arranged by the production company. While there is considerable overlap in the usage of the terms scripted reality TV and reality TV, the scripted variant will usually not leave the plot or the story's outcome to chance.

Producers
Notable producers include
 MTV
 Pop
 RTL Television
 TF1
 TruTV
 ITV2
 E4

Awards
Primetime Emmy Award for Outstanding Structured Reality Program
Critics' Choice Television Award for Best Structured Reality Show

See also
 Reality television
 Criticism of reality television
 Docufiction
 Infotainment

References

Reality television